Trissino is a comune in the province of Vicenza, in northern Italy. Its mayor is Davide Faccio (member of Lega Nord, right). The town is famous all over Italy for its hockey team, the Gruppo Sportivo Hockey Trissino.

Twin towns
Trissino is twinned with:

  Neu-Ulm, Germany, since 1990

References